Bristol County may refer to:

Places
 Bristol County, Massachusetts, United States
 Bristol County, Rhode Island, United States
 Bristol, a ceremonial county in England

Other uses
 USS Bristol County (LST-1198), a US Navy Newport class tank landing ship

County name disambiguation pages